DataMeet is a user-generated community primarily focused around open data and data science in India. DataMeet was registered as a trust in February 2014. Typical discussions are around collecting, arranging and using open data. DataMeet events are held in Ahmedabad,  Bangalore, Delhi, Mumbai and Pune.

History
DataMeet started as a small google group with meetups in Bangalore and later spread to other Indian cities. DataMeet now involves Meetups, Workshops, Hackathons and a yearly event called Open Data Camp.

Current activity

Meetups
DataMeet frequently organizes open meetups related to open data and other social issues.

Open Data Camp
Every summer since 2012, DataMeet has organized a two-day open data event called Open Data Camp in Bangalore. Open Data Camp has also been held in Delhi since November 2014.

Hackathons
For 2014 Indian general election, the largest ever elections in the world, DataMeet organized a hackathon focusing on election-related open data.

Other Activity
Open City Initiative: DataMeet is developing a repository of urban data under the Open City Initiative

References

Meetings
Business conferences in India